Iranians in Malaysia comprise students and business students, expatriates and business owners.

Migration history 
As of 2011, there were approximately 60,000 Iranians studying or working. They have shares on 2,000 Malaysian businesses and occupy about 15,000 spots in Malaysian universities. Naturalisation is uncommon; as Christoph Marcinowski of the Middle East Institute observed, "it is very difficult for any foreign-born national, including Iranians, to obtain Malaysian citizenship".

See also 
 Iran–Malaysia relations

References 

Iranian
Malaysia
Iran–Malaysia relations
 
Immigration to Malaysia